The 1995-96 season of the FA Women's Premier League was the 5th season of the former top flight of English women's association football.

National Division

References

Ilkeston Football

Eng
women
FA Women's National League seasons
1